Marie Yves Dina Jean Pierre (born 14 January 1990) is a Haitian women's association football player who plays as a defender.

External links 
 

1990 births
Living people
Women's association football defenders
Haitian women's footballers
Haiti women's international footballers
Competitors at the 2014 Central American and Caribbean Games